West Union may refer to several places in the United States:

 West Union, Illinois
 West Union, Indiana, Parke County
 West Union (Busro), Indiana, an abandoned Shaker community in Knox County
 West Union, Iowa
 West Union, Minnesota
 West Union, Missouri
 West Union, New York
 West Union, Ohio
 West Union, Oregon
 West Union, South Carolina
 West Union, West Virginia, Doddridge County
 West Union, Pocahontas County, West Virginia
 Dallas, West Virginia, Marshall County, also known as West Union
 West Union Creek, a stream in San Mateo County, California

See also
 West Union Township (disambiguation)